The Tunnel  is a 2009 film directed by Jenna Bass.

Synopsis
Set in Matabeleland during the 80s, The Tunnel follows young Elizabeth, who loves inventing tall tales. When she arrives at a guerrilla camp desperate for help, Elizabeth must tell her greatest story of all, a story about her village, strangers, ghosts, the day her father dug a tunnel to the city and her journey to find him. As the story unfolds, Elizabeth embarks on a quest for truth, weaving together fact and illusion. But reality is not far behind and, to save her village, Elizabeth will have to confront it.

External links

2009 films
South African short films